Richard Rubin may refer to:
Richard Rubin (writer) (born 1967), American writer
Richard Rubin (TV personality) (born 1983), American television personality and entertainer

See also
Rick Rubin (born 1963), American music producer